Ain Saarmann (born on 6 April 1939 in Põltsamaa) is an Estonian politician.

1992–1993, he was Minister of Economic Affairs.

References

Living people
1939 births
People from Põltsamaa 
Economy ministers of Estonia